Eugen Bircher (17 February 1882 – 20 October 1956) was a Swiss politician and military leader who became associated with a pro-German position in the inter-war years.

Military and political career 
Bircher came to prominence in the army where he rose to the rank of colonel, the highest used in Switzerland in peacetime. In 1934 he was promoted to Major General (Commander of 4., later 5. Division). Together with Federal Counselor Rudolf Minger he was a leading promoter of Swiss armament and preparedness between 1934 and 1939. Bircher published a lot of medical, political and military books and articles.

An opponent of immigration he formed during "Landesgeneralstreik" the Schweizerischer Vaterländischer Verband, SVV in 1919 as a militia and semi-secret society to support his viewpoint. The group became influential amongst army officers in the years following the First World War. The position as leader of SVV was boosted by Bircher's spells as president of the Swiss Officers Society (1931-7) and editor of the official Swiss Army newspaper (1934–42). An influential figure in society, Bircher numbered the federal councillors Marcel Pilet-Golaz, Giuseppe Motta, Eduard von Steiger, Philipp Etter, Walther Stampfli and Ernst Wetter amongst his close political associates.

Bircher sought a close relationship between Switzerland and Nazi Germany and it has even been alleged that he funded Adolf Hitler in his early years (although no conclusive evidence has as yet been provided), and his biographer rejects this claim outright. He also organized medical corps for the Eastern Front on the pretext of anti-communism.

Medical career 
Bircher was a physician (Chief Surgeon 1917 - 1932, Director 1932/34 of "Kantonsspital Aarau") by trade and in the 1920s published several ground-breaking papers detailing arthroscopy procedures on the knee.  Bircher is often considered the inventor of arthroscopy of the knee, although the Japanese surgeon Masaki Watanabe receives primary credit for using arthroscopy for interventional surgery.  After diagnosing torn tissue through arthroscopy, Bircher used open surgery to remove or repair the damaged tissue.  Initially, he used an electric Jacobaeus thoracolaparoscope for his diagnostic procedures, but later became devoted to double-contrast radiography for diagnostics.  Bircher gave up endoscopy in 1930, and his work was largely neglected for several decades.

Sources 

Daniel Heller, Eugen Bircher, Arzt, Militär, Politiker, NZZ Zürich 1988.

References 

1882 births
1956 deaths
People from Aarau
Swiss Calvinist and Reformed Christians
Party of Farmers, Traders and Independents politicians
Members of the National Council (Switzerland)
Swiss generals
Swiss surgeons
Swiss anti-communists
20th-century surgeons